Bulletscript is a five-piece South African metal band from Cape Town. They were formed in 2006.

History 
Bulletscript toured Namibia with Half Price in 2015. They also participated in the South African Wacken metal battle Final.

In 2015, Bulletscript opened for Darkest Hour in Cape Town.

Studio Releases 
 Knotted (2014)

Band members

Current members 
 Brett Bruton - Vocals
 Jacques Hugo - Guitar
 Oliver Saggerson - Guitar
 Jacques du Toit - Bass
 Kyle Curran - Drums

Previous members 
 Ian Watson
Marcus van der Tuin
 Matthew Howard-Tripp

References 

Musical groups from Cape Town
South African heavy metal musical groups
Musical quintets
South African musical groups